Baldwin III (1129 – 10 February 1163) was King of Jerusalem from 1143 to 1163. He was the eldest son of Melisende and Fulk of Jerusalem. He became king while still a child, and was at first overshadowed by his mother Melisende, whom he eventually defeated in a civil war. During his reign Jerusalem became more closely allied with the Byzantine Empire, and the Second Crusade tried and failed to conquer Damascus. Baldwin captured the important Egyptian fortress of Ascalon, but also had to deal with the increasing power of Nur ad-Din in Syria. He died childless and was succeeded by his brother Amalric.

Succession
Baldwin III was born in 1129, during the reign of his maternal grandfather Baldwin II, one of the original crusaders. This made him the third generation to rule Jerusalem. Baldwin's mother Princess Melisende was heiress to her father Baldwin II, King of Jerusalem. Baldwin III's father was Fulk of Anjou, the former Count of Anjou. King Baldwin II died at the age of 60 when his grandson was a year old, which led to a power struggle between Melisende and Fulk. Melisende asserted her right to rule as successor to her father. She and Fulk reconciled and conceived a second child, Baldwin III's brother Amalric. Baldwin III was 13 years old when his father Fulk died in a hunting accident in 1143, and Baldwin III was crowned as co-ruler alongside his mother, echoing Melisende's own crowning alongside her father as his heir. Yet Baldwin showed little interest in the intricacies of governance.

With a woman and a child ruling Jerusalem, the political situation was somewhat tense; the northern crusader states of Tripoli, Antioch, and Edessa increasingly asserted their independence, and there was no king to impose the suzerainty of Jerusalem as Baldwin II or Fulk had done. In the Muslim world, Zengi ruled northern Syria from the cities of Mosul and Aleppo, and desired to add Damascus in the south to his control. In 1144, Zengi captured Edessa, which shocked the Western world and led to the Second Crusade.

This crusade did not reach Jerusalem until 1148, and in the meantime Zengi was assassinated in 1146. He was succeeded by his son Nur ad-Din, who was just as eager to bring Damascus under his control. To counter this, Jerusalem and Damascus had made an alliance for their mutual protection. However, in 1147 Nur ad-Din and Mu'in ad-Din Unur, the governor of Damascus, made an alliance against Jerusalem, as the kingdom had already broken the treaty by allying with one of Unur's rebellious vassals. Baldwin marched out from Jerusalem and attempted to capture the Muslim fortress Bosra, but Nur ad-Din arrived with his army and forced the Crusaders to withdraw. As the Crusaders marched back toward their own territory they were attacked by Nur ad-Din's cavalry, but Baldwin III's generalship combined with the martial prowess of his knights managed to throw off the Muslim assault. Later, Jerusalem's truce with Damascus was restored.

Second Crusade

In 1148 the crusade finally arrived in Jerusalem, led by Louis VII of France, his wife Eleanor of Aquitaine, and Conrad III of Germany. Baldwin held a council at Acre in 1148 to decide on a target; control of Aleppo in the north would allow the crusaders to restore Edessa to Christian control, but capturing Damascus in the south would limit the power of the Zengids and add to Jerusalem's power and influence. Damascus was also considered more important in the history of Christianity than Aleppo and Edessa. Baldwin agreed to the plan to attack Damascus, but the ensuing siege ended in defeat after only four days. The city fell under Nur ad-Din's control in 1154, and the loss of a Muslim counterweight to Nur ad-Din was a diplomatic disaster.

By 1149 the crusaders had returned to Europe, leaving behind a weakened Jerusalem. Nur ad-Din took advantage of the crusader defeat to invade Antioch, and Prince Raymond was killed in the subsequent Battle of Inab. Baldwin III hurried north to take up the regency of the principality. Raymond's wife, Constance, was Baldwin's cousin through his mother and heiress of Antioch by right of her father. Baldwin unsuccessfully tried to marry her to an ally. Also in the north, Baldwin was unable to help defend Turbessel, the last remnant of the County of Edessa, and was forced to cede it to Byzantine emperor Manuel I Comnenus in August 1150. He evacuated Turbessel's Latin Christian residents despite being attacked by Nur ad-Din in the Battle of Aintab. In 1152 Baldwin and his mother were called to intervene in a dispute between Baldwin's aunt Hodierna of Tripoli and her husband Count Raymond II. When the matter was settled, Hodierna was about to return to Jerusalem with them, when Raymond was suddenly murdered by the Hashshashin. Baldwin remained behind to settle the affairs of Tripoli, while Hodierna took up the regency for her young son Raymond III.

Civil war
By 1152 Baldwin had been of age to rule by himself for seven years, and he began to assert himself in political affairs. Though he had not previously expressed an interest in the administration of the country, he now demanded more authority. He and his mother had become increasingly estranged since 1150, and Baldwin blamed the constable Manasses for interfering with his legal succession. In early 1152 Baldwin demanded a second coronation from Patriarch Fulcher, separate from his mother. The patriarch refused and as a kind of self-coronation Baldwin paraded through the city streets with laurel wreaths on his head.

Baldwin and Melisende agreed to put the matter before the Haute Cour, or royal council. The Haute Cour returned a decision that would divide the kingdom into two administrative districts. Baldwin would retain Galilee in the north, including the cities of Acre and Tyre, while Melisende held the richer Judea and Samaria, including Nablus and Jerusalem itself. Supporting Melisende in the south were Manasses, and Baldwin's younger brother Amalric, who held the County of Jaffa within Melisende's jurisdiction. Neither Baldwin nor Melisende were pleased with the decision, as Baldwin wanted to rule the entire kingdom and realized it would divide the country's resources, but in order to prevent a civil war Melisende agreed to the compromise.

Within weeks of the division Baldwin launched an invasion of the south. Manasses was defeated at the castle of Mirabel and exiled, and Nablus fell quickly as well. To prevent further violence, Jerusalem opened its gates to Baldwin. Melisende and Amalric sought refuge in the Tower of David. Throughout the siege the church negotiated with Baldwin. The peace that was settled allowed for Melisende to hold Nablus for life, with a solemn oath by Baldwin not to disturb her peace. Baldwin named his supporter Humphrey II of Toron as the new constable.

By 1154 mother and son were reconciled, as Baldwin was astute enough to realize his mother's expertise in statecraft. At the same time, he asserted his authority over the kingdom's nobles. Though she was "retired", she maintained great influence in court and government affairs, acting as regent for Baldwin while he was on campaign.

Recovery
During the civil war, Nur ad-Din had been busy consolidating his control of Damascus following the death of Mu'in ad-Din. With Syria united under one ruler, Jerusalem could only expand its influence to the south, towards Egypt. Egypt was weakened by civil wars as well, after the succession of a series of young Fatimid caliphs. Around 1150 Baldwin refortified Gaza to place some pressure on the nearby Egyptian outpost of Ascalon, and in 1153 Baldwin successfully besieged and captured Ascalon itself. This secured the border with Egypt, although it would later lead to aggressive campaigns against Jerusalem's southern border. Ascalon was added to Amalric's fief of Jaffa, creating the double County of Jaffa and Ascalon. In 1152 Baldwin also defeated an Ortoqid invasion of the kingdom from northern Syria.

In 1156 Baldwin was forced to sign a treaty with Nur ad-Din. However, in the winter of 1157–1158 Baldwin led an expedition into Syria, where he besieged Shaizar. The expedition was forced to withdraw when a dispute arose between Thierry, Count of Flanders and Raynald of Châtillon, the new husband of Constance of Antioch, both of whom wanted Shaizar for themselves. Baldwin was, however, able to capture Harim, a former territory of Antioch, and in 1158 he defeated Nur ad-Din himself.

Byzantine alliance
Baldwin's modest recovery garnered him enough prestige to seek a wife from the Byzantine Empire. In 1157 he sent Humphrey of Toron to negotiate with Emperor Manuel, and it was decided that Baldwin should marry Theodora, Manuel's niece. The alliance was more favourable to Byzantium than Jerusalem, as Baldwin was forced to recognize Byzantine suzerainty over Antioch, and if Theodora were to be widowed she would be provided the city of Acre. Though Theodora personified the Byzantine-Jerusalem alliance, she was not to exercise any authority outside of Acre. The marriage took place in September 1158, when Baldwin was 28 years old and Theodora only 13.

Relations between Jerusalem and Byzantium improved and in 1159 Baldwin met with Manuel in Antioch. The two became friends, with Manuel adopting western clothes and customs and participating in a tournament against Baldwin. Manuel personally attended to Baldwin when the king was thrown from his horse during the tournament. Later in 1159 Baldwin became regent of Antioch once more, after Raynald of Châtillon had been captured in battle. This offended Manuel, who considered Antioch imperial territory, and the emperor strengthened his ties to the principality in 1160 by marrying Princess Maria, Baldwin's cousin. Baldwin himself suggested Manuel marry another cousin, Melisende of Tripoli, preferring not to see such a close relationship between Byzantium and Antioch.

Death

Queen Melisende died in 1161, and Baldwin died in Beirut on 10 February 1163. It was rumoured that he had been poisoned in Antioch by pills given to him by his Syrian Orthodox doctor. "As soon as the king had taken the pills," says William of Tyre, "he was seized with a fever and dysentery which developed into consumption from which he was never able to obtain relief or help." On the way home Baldwin remained in Tripoli for a few months, and then continued to Beirut where he finally succumbed to his illness. As William says, "For eight successive days, while the funeral procession moved from Beirut to Jerusalem, lamentation was unrestrained and grief was renewed almost hourly." Theodora, now queen-dowager, retired to Acre. She was still only 18 years old; their marriage was childless. Baldwin was succeeded by his brother, Amalric I.

A marble screen panel in the Terra Sancta Museum, Jerusalem, is from his or Fulk's tomb, formerly in the Church of the Holy Sepulchre.

Personal characteristics
William of Tyre knew Baldwin personally and gives a lengthy description of the king:

Baldwin was well educated, well spoken, and exceptionally intelligent. Unlike his father he had an excellent memory. He spent much of his spare time reading history and was knowledgeable in the jus consuetudinarium of the kingdom, later collected by lawyers like John of Ibelin and Philip of Novara as "the assizes of Jerusalem". He respected church property and did not burden them with taxes. He was friendly to people of all classes, and "voluntarily offered an opportunity of conversing with him to anyone who wished it or whom he casually met. If an audience was requested, he did not refuse it." As a young man he enjoyed dice and other games, and carried on affairs with married women, but as an adult he "became changed for the better", as William says, and remained faithful to Theodora. He was popular and respected by all of his subjects, and even had the respect of his enemy Nur ad-Din, who said of Baldwin's death, "the Franks have lost such a prince that the world has not now his like."

References

Sources

1130 births
1163 deaths
12th-century kings of Jerusalem
Kings of Jerusalem
12th-century deaths from tuberculosis
Deaths from dysentery
Deaths by poisoning
Christians of the Second Crusade
Medieval child monarchs
Burials at the Church of the Holy Sepulchre
Tuberculosis deaths in Lebanon
Infectious disease deaths in Lebanon
Crusader–Fatimid wars